The Woodworth House, also known as the Old Oaken Bucket Homestead, is a historic house at 47 Old Oaken Bucket Road in Scituate, Massachusetts.  The oldest portion of this house was built c. 1675, and is now an ell on the main house, a Cape style structure built in 1826.  The house is most notable for its association with Samuel Woodworth, who in 1817 wrote the poem "The Old Oaken Bucket" about an old well on this property.

The football trophy the Old Oaken Bucket, which is contested for annually by Indiana University and Purdue University, was inspired by the poem and the song crafted from the poem.

The property was listed on the National Register of Historic Places in 1996.

See also
National Register of Historic Places listings in Plymouth County, Massachusetts

References

National Register of Historic Places in Plymouth County, Massachusetts
Federal architecture in Massachusetts
Gothic Revival architecture in Massachusetts
Houses completed in 1823
Buildings and structures in Scituate, Massachusetts
Houses in Plymouth County, Massachusetts